Mark Wingett (born 1961) is an English actor.

Wingett may also refer to

Wingett Run, Ohio, an unincorporated community in the United States
John Wingett Davies (1908–1992), British cinema operator and director of Davies and Newman

See also
Winget (disambiguation)